The 1998 season of the Liga de Fútbol Profesional Boliviano was the 41st season of top-tier football in Bolivia.

Torneo Apertura

Torneo Clausura

Group A

Group B

Aggregate table

Final stage

Play-offs

Championship 

Blooming won the title and qualified for the Copa Libertadores 1999, alongside Jorge Wilstermann.

Promotion/relegation 

Destroyers remain at first level; Unión Central from Tarija won promotion

Title

References 
 RSSSF Page

Bolivian Primera División seasons
Bolivia
1998 in Bolivian football